The Swiss Federal Council is elected by the 246 members of the Federal Assembly of Switzerland by secret ballot.
Regular elections take place every four years, in the first session following the Swiss federal elections. Additionally, an election is held to replace Federal Councillors who have announced their retirement or who have died in office.

The procedure of the election is guided both by legal requirements set down in the Swiss Constitution, and by informal understandings between the major parties, such as the Zauberformel which describes a long-standing Concordance system in which the four major Swiss parties, the Free Democratic Party, the Christian Democratic People's Party, the Swiss People's Party and the Social Democratic Party, mutually concede the right to a representation in the Federal Council roughly corresponding to each party's ballot in the general election.

The legal requirements for the election are as in article 175 of the constitution and in articles 132f of the parliamentary law of 2003.

It is customary to confirm sitting councillors seeking re-election. Non-reelection of a candidate has occurred only four times in the history of the Swiss federal state, twice in the 19th century (Ulrich Ochsenbein 1854), Jean-Jacques Challet-Venel 1872) and twice in the 21st (Ruth Metzler-Arnold 2003, Christoph Blocher 2007).

Councillors once elected have the right to serve their term and there is no mechanism by which the parliament could enforce their retirement. Each of the seven seats is subject to an individual election, held in sequence of seniority. It is customary for the major parties to nominate candidates, but these are not legally binding on the Assembly. Especially when there are several vacancies to be filled, the individual factions tend to honour these nominations in order to increase the likelihood of their own nominations being honoured. There have still been many cases where such candidacies have been ignored, with another, non-nominated member of the same party elected instead.

Since 1999, the constitution requires that the Federal Council duly represents all regions and linguistic groups. Prior to 1999, it was merely required that only one Councillor from any given canton may hold office at any time.
 
Beyond the legal requirements, there are a number of long-standing traditions in the composition of the Council:
The Federal Council never consisted of German-speaking members only, in spite of the Swiss German cantons recruiting a clear majority of the Federal Assembly. Councillors from the German-speaking cantons have, however, always been in the majority, usually in a 4:3 or 5:2 ratio. A majority of six German-speaking Councillors occurred only once, in the 1876 to 1880 term. The "Stammlande" principle traditionally elected only Councillors whose party held a majority in their own canton of origin.

There have been repeated attempts to reform the system of election to one of direct popular election. A popular initiative to this effect was repudiated in 1900 and again in 1942. The main argument against a popular election is the problematic balance of linguistic and regional minorities. A pure  plurality voting system would likely result in a Federal Council composed exclusively of representatives of the urban, German-speaking cantons, which account for a majority of the Swiss population.

Individual elections

References

historical election results, from the official website of the Swiss parliament.

See also
List of members of the Swiss Federal Council
List of members of the Swiss Federal Council by date

 
Election